Anselmo is a village in Custer County, Nebraska, United States. The population was 145 at the 2010 census.

History
Anselmo was platted in 1886 when the Burlington and Missouri River Railroad was extended to that point. It was named for Anselmo B. Smith, a railroad official.

Geography
Anselmo is located at  (41.618935, -99.864292).

Climate

Demographics

2010 census
As of the census of 2010, there were 145 people, 62 households, and 44 families living in the village. The racial makeup of the village was 98.6% White and 1.4% from two or more races. Hispanic or Latino of any race were 2.8% of the population.

There were 62 households, of which 27.4% had children under the age of 18 living with them, 51.6% were married couples living together, 12.9% had a female householder with no husband present, 6.5% had a male householder with no wife present, and 29.0% were non-families. 27.4% of all households were made up of individuals, and 14.5% had someone living alone who was 65 years of age or older. The average household size was 2.34 and the average family size was 2.77.

The median age in the village was 45.5 years. 23.4% of residents were under the age of 18; 6.2% were between the ages of 18 and 24; 18.6% were from 25 to 44; 27.7% were from 45 to 64; and 24.1% were 65 years of age or older. The gender makeup of the village was 55.2% male and 44.8% female.

2000 census
As of the census of 2000, there were 159 people, 68 households, and 46 families living in the village. The population density was 598.6 people per square mile (227.4/km2). There were 80 housing units at an average density of 301.2 per square mile (114.4/km2). The racial makeup of the village was 98.11% White, 0.63% Native American, and 1.26% from two or more races.

There were 68 households, out of which 26.5% had children under the age of 18 living with them, 52.9% were married couples living together, 10.3% had a female householder with no husband present, and 30.9% were non-families. 29.4% of all households were made up of individuals, and 7.4% had someone living alone who was 65 years of age or older. The average household size was 2.34 and the average family size was 2.87.

In the village, the population was spread out, with 25.2% under the age of 18, 8.2% from 18 to 24, 25.8% from 25 to 44, 24.5% from 45 to 64, and 16.4% who were 65 years of age or older. The median age was 40 years. For every 100 females, there were 106.5 males. For every 100 females age 18 and over, there were 101.7 males.

As of 2000 the median income for a household in the village was $28,281, and the median income for a family was $40,417. Males had a median income of $23,750 versus $11,750 for females. The per capita income for the village was $13,892. About 9.1% of families and 10.0% of the population were below the poverty line, including 7.3% of those under the age of eighteen and none of those 65 or over.

References

Villages in Custer County, Nebraska
Villages in Nebraska